Daduhepa (also written Daduḫepa or Duduḫepa) was a Hittite queen (Tawananna) who reigned in the 14th century BC. Her lineage is obscure, but she is believed to have been the consort of either Tudḫaliya I or Šuppiluliuma I.

Biography 
Daduhepa was one of the queens of the Hittite New Kingdom, and was one of the first Hittite queens to have a Hurrian name after the Hittites incorporated that group into their empire.

In some sources, Daduhepa is stated to have been a wife of Šuppiluliuma I along with Ḫenti, who also had a Hurrian name. In this case, she would have had the sons Arnuwanda II and Muršili II.

In more recent studies, evidence points to Daduhepa being the consort of Šuppiluliuma's father, who is known as Tudḫaliya or Tašmišarri. Because she was written about as being queen during her son's rule, Daduhepa is believed to have outlived her husband and maintained her status of queen, as per the Tawananna tradition. She has been found depicted and named on several seals alongside her son Šuppiluliuma. She retained her status until her death around 1345 BC, after which Henti, the first wife of Šuppiluliuma, assumed the title of Tawananna and the queenship.

References

Notes

Bibliography 

 
 
 

Hittite queens
14th-century BC women